Aeons Black is the fourth studio album by Swedish band Aeon, released on 20 November 2012. It is the only Aeon record featuring bassist Marcus Edvardsson, who left the band in March 2013, and the first record since 1999's Dark Order to feature drummer Arttu Malkki. It is also the last album to feature Malkki as he has left the band due to family reasons, as well as the last album to feature rhythm guitarist Daniel Dlimi.

Background
Commented Aeon founding guitarist Zeb Nilsson: "This is definitely our most varied album to date; it has heavier songs, yet it also has lots of fast blastbeats and double bass drumming. It's groovier this time, which I think we lacked on our last album, 'Path Of Fire', which was fast-paced almost all the way through. That, and the amazing mix by Ronnie Björnström, makes me feel pretty confident that this album will appeal to more people than our previous albums. And no, we have not gone softer in any aspect; it's just easier to catch with all this grooviness. It's metal right up your ass!"

Track listing

Personnel
Credits are adapted from the album's liner notes.

Aeon
 Tommy Dahlström – vocals
 Zeb Nilsson – lead guitar
 Daniel Dlimi – rhythm guitar
 Marcus Edvardsson – bass
 Arttu Malkki  – drums

Production and design
 Aeon − production, arrangement
 Ronnie Björnström − production, engineering, mixing, mastering
 Daniel Dlimi − engineering
 Markus Edvardsson − engineering
 Kristian "Necrolord" Wåhlin − artwork
 Fredrik Wallin − photography

References

2012 albums
Aeon (band) albums
Metal Blade Records albums